Deduce, You Say is a 1956 Warner Bros. Looney Tunes cartoon, directed by Chuck Jones and written by Michael Maltese. The short was released on September 29, 1956, and stars Daffy Duck and Porky Pig. The title is a play on the exclamation, "The deuce, you say!"

The cartoon features Daffy Duck as the dim-witted detective Dorlock Homes (a parody of Sherlock Holmes) and Porky Pig as his sidekick Watkins (Dr. Watson), as they attempt to locate and apprehend the dangerous "Shropshire Slasher."

Plot
Dr. Watkins narrates throughout the cartoon. Dorlock Homes lives on Beeker Street in London. Inside their apartment, Homes is busily engaged in "deduction" — tax deduction, that is, hoping to write off such costs as "magnifying glasses and gumshoes" and "cab fares, to and from murders." Following a knock on the door, a telegram deliveryman falls into their flat. While Homes attributes it to curare, a type of poison, the deliveryman chides him for not fixing the step. Homes, angry, quickly snatches the letter from his hands and sternly informs him in no uncertain terms, "Just for that, you receive no gratuity." The telegram is from an infamous criminal known as the Shropshire Slasher, informing Homes that he has escaped from prison, and plans to resume "slashing" innocent citizens.

Homes and Watkins enter a pub the Slasher is known to haunt. Homes' attempts to gather clues land darts in his bill. When the Shropshire Slasher is finally revealed, Homes repeatedly attempts to arrest him, but the Slasher proves much stronger, and effortlessly defeats Homes. Watkins, on the other hand, speaks much more politely and reasonably to the suspect and he not only willingly divulges his identity, but is peacefully persuaded to turn himself back over to the police.

Just then, a kind, old woman arrives selling flowers. Homes accuses her of selling them without a license and threatens to arrest her. The Shropshire Slasher moans "Mother!" Before Homes has time to consider what has happened, the Shropshire Slasher grabs him by the neck and starts shaking him violently, causing an assortment of objects to fall from Homes' person. The Shropshire Slasher and his mother then leave, with him explaining to her that he promised "the nice gentleman" that he would give himself up, and her praising him for willingly doing so. Watkins asks a beat-up looking Homes in what school he learned to be a detective. Homes answers: "Elementary, my dear Watkins. Elementary."

Reception
Animation historian Jerry Beck writes, "Deduce, You Say is an outrageously witty film that parodies both the original Sherlock Holmes books by Conan Doyle and the Hollywood movie versions ... The premise allowed [Chuck] Jones to combine Daffy's frantic animated action with Porky's subtle attitudes, facial expressions, and posing, which get just as many laughs. A class act, and a first-rate cartoon."

Cast
 Mel Blanc as Daffy Duck (as Dorlock Homes), Porky Pig (as Dr. Watkins), The Shropshire Slasher, the Telegram Deliveryman, Alfie, and the Bartender
 June Foray as The Shropshire Slasher's Mother and Lady Ashtabula (uncredited)

Home media
This short can be found on Disc Two of the Looney Tunes Golden Collection: Volume 1 DVD set, Disc One of the Looney Tunes Platinum Collection: Volume 2 Blu-ray set, and Disc One of The Essential Daffy Duck DVD set.

References

External links
 

1956 films
1956 animated films
1956 short films
Looney Tunes shorts
Short films directed by Chuck Jones
Daffy Duck films
Porky Pig films
Sherlock Holmes pastiches
1950s Warner Bros. animated short films
1950s mystery films
American mystery films
Films scored by Milt Franklyn
Films with screenplays by Michael Maltese
American detective films
Animated films set in London
Films produced by Edward Selzer
1950s English-language films